Craig Scott Bounds (born February 12, 1962) is a Republican member of the Mississippi House of Representatives from the 44th District. He was first elected in 2003 as a Democrat
 but subsequently switched to Republican affiliation.

He resides in his native Philadelphia in Nesohba County in east central Mississippi.

References

1962 births
Living people
Republican Party members of the Mississippi House of Representatives
People from Philadelphia, Mississippi
21st-century American politicians